The Brunei National Rugby Team represents Brunei in international rugby union. They have yet to make their debut at the Rugby World Cup. It is governed by the Brunei Rugby Football Union (BRFU).

History
Rugby Union, which is played in 105 countries around the world, has been played in Brunei since the 1950s. 

The Brunei Rugby Football Union was set up in 1977, affiliated to the Rugby Football Union (RFU) of Twickenham. From then on, Brunei regularly sent teams to participate in regional 'Sevens' competitions, particularly the SCC Sevens in Singapore and the prestigious Hong Kong Sevens.

Since joining the Asian Rugby Football Union, the Brunei Rugby Team has taken part in a number of international competitions. Although presently recording a somewhat unfavorable Win-loss ratio in the international rugby scene, Brunei rugby is continually improving with efforts concentrating on youth players' development through the Under-19 Squad.

The Brunei national rugby union team plays in the Asian Rugby Football Union 6th Division along with Indonesia, Cambodia and Laos.

Under-19 Squad

The Under-19 National Rugby Squad of Brunei is seen as a platform from which the Brunei Rugby Football Union seeks to develop young players for the Senior team. Currently, the Under-19 squad has played in two Asian Under-19 Rugby Tournaments (as of September 2007) in Lahore, Pakistan and Taipei, Taiwan respectively. 

The first ever Brunei Under-19 Rugby International was played against the Pakistan Under-19 Team at the Fortress Stadium in Lahore. Brunei emerged victorious with a scoreline of 14-5 in their favour - an upset considering the comparative populations and rugby history of the respective countries. Former Fiji National coach George Dreadon Simpkin commented on the impressive pace of the Bruneian backline whilst spectating the encounter. The free-running style of open, fast-paced play has become a trademark of the Bruneian team, although it has come under heavy criticism for sacrificing form and discipline in the favour of quick, energy-consuming tries.

The members of the first ever Brunei Under-19 Squad selected for the 2005 Asian Under-19 Rugby Tournament are as follows:

Manager: Stuart Alpe 

Coaches: Tim Lian (Backs), Shafeek Kamalie (Forwards)

Players: 
1.  Muhd Khairuddeen bin D.P Haji Hamzah
2.  Hj Mohd Azmiee Hj Mohd Sunnylai
3.  Adrin Anak Salanjat
4.  Yeo Hock Wee
5.  Mohd Halim Mustaffa
6.  Emmanuel bin Surat 
7.  Mohd Zulfadhli bin Haji Md Jali
8.  Abd Amir bin Matjaneh
9.  Ak Abd Muiz Pg Hj Abd Rahman 
10. Muhammed Raushan Mohd Yuzer 
11. Lim Shen Quan 
12. Md Isa bin Haji Mohamad
13. Dinlee Ak Apo
14. Faridzul Daud Ak Dumi
15. Rangga Ak Tinggi 
16. Christian Daniel Wong Kim Him
17. Md Hanafi Yusof
18. Mohd Farhan Hj Ismail
19. Mohd Sallihen Hj Bujang
20. Samuel Tan Yon Xiang
21. Ak Muhd Zulhilmi Pg Suhaimi 
22. Muhammad Aziman bin Awang Nasir

See also
 Rugby union in Brunei
 Brunei national rugby union team (sevens)

References

External links
  Rugby in Asia
 Brunei Rugby Football Union
  on pakistanrugby.com
  on brudirect.com
  on Pakistan rugby.com
  on rugbydata.com

Asian national rugby union teams
Rugby union in Brunei
National sports teams of Brunei